Igrar Habib oglu Aliyev (14 March 1924, Baku – 11 June 2004, Baku) was a Soviet and Azerbaijani historian. Aliyev was the author of 160 peer reviewed journal publications and books. Many of his books are devoted to the Medes and Median Empire. Among his writings are: "The History Of Media"(Baku, 1960), "A Historical Survey of Atropatena" (Baku, 1989), "History of Azerbaijan (Baku, 1993, and in Russian, 1995). "Nagorno Karabakh: History, Facts and Events", No. 22-34 (Baku: Elm, 1982), "On Problems Related to the Ethnic History of the Azerbaijani People" (Baku: Nurlan, 2002), "The History of Aturpatakan" (also translated into Persian, published in Iran in 1999).

Aliyev was a director of the Institute of History of the National Academy of Sciences of Azerbaijan. He followed the methodology of the world-famous Soviet academician V. V. Struve, who was a leading specialist in the field of ancient Oriental studies. Aliyev knew ancient dead languages including Sumerian, Akkadian and Old Persian. His works specialized in ancient Media, Atropatena and Caucasian Albania and are cited by Western experts in the relevant fields.

Controversy
A pamphlet written in 1997 on architecture in Artsakh by Aliyev and Kamil Mamedzade, the two authors also asserted that the celebrated thirteenth century Gandzasar monastery, built by the Armenian prince Hasan-Jalal Dawla, was built by Caucasian Albanians. The pamphlet, which refers to the Armenians of Karabakh as "so-called Armenians" because of their alleged descent from the purported Albanian population of the region and which others have pointed out fails properly to show readers the medieval Armenian inscriptions of the monastery, goes on to claim:

Works 

 The History of Media, Baku, 1960. (Also translated into Persian, Published in Iran)
 The Survey of History of Atropatene, Baku, 1989.
 Nagorny Karabakh: history, facts, events. "Elm", Baku, no. 22-34, 1982.
 The History of Azerbaijan, Baku, 1993
  The History of Azerbaijan, Baku, 1995.
 The History of Aturpatakan. (Also translated into Persian, Published in Iran)
 The History of Azerbaijan, 1st volume of seven.

Notes

External links 
 Remembering Igrar Aliyev: Historian of Ancient Azerbaijan in Azerbaijan International Online, Autumn 2004

1924 births
2004 deaths
20th-century Azerbaijani historians
Writers from Baku
Soviet historians